James Martin Kelly (born September 6, 1954) is an American veteran character actor and writer known for his roles in Mob City and Magic Mike.

Kelly was born in Brooklyn, New York and before acting worked at the post office. He studied the Eric Morris process of acting, and soon left his job at the Post Office to work full-time as an actor and moved to Los Angeles.

Filmography

References

External links

1954 births
Male actors from Florida
Male actors from Los Angeles
Living people
People from Brooklyn